Graphium poggianus is a butterfly in the family Papilionidae. It is found in northern Angola, the southern part of the Democratic Republic of the Congo and north-western Zambia.

Description
Larger [than related species], the length of the forewing about 48 mm., the markings whitish; fore
wing without submarginal spots; in the cell, opposite to cellule 3, a large transverse spot which reaches the front margin of the cell and is united with three long discal spots in cellules 2-—4; the discal spot in cellule 2 is very long, almost reaching the margin, but narrow, so that it only covers the anterior part of the cellule; the discal spots in 1 a and 1 b consequently form a free hindmarginal spot, which almost reaches the margin, but is rather far removed from the base; the discal spots in 6 and 8 arranged almost exactly as in the other species; the transverse band of the hindwing broad, almost reaching the base and the apex of the cell; the broad dark submarginal band in each of cellules 2—-5 with two long whitish, somewhat irregular streaks. — Angola.

Taxonomy
Graphium poggianus belongs to a species group with 16 members. All are very similar
The species group members are:
Graphium abri Smith & Vane-Wright, 2001 
Graphium adamastor  (Boisduval, 1836) 
Graphium agamedes (Westwood, 1842)
Graphium almansor (Honrath, 1884)
Graphium auriger (Butler, 1876) 
Graphium aurivilliusi (Seeldrayers, 1896)
Graphium fulleri  (Grose-Smith, 1883)
Graphium hachei (Dewitz, 1881)
Graphium kigoma Carcasson, 1964
Graphium olbrechtsi Berger, 1950
Graphium poggianus (Honrath, 1884)
Graphium rileyi Berger, 1950
Graphium schubotzi (Schultze, 1913)
Graphium simoni (Aurivillius, 1899),
Graphium ucalegon  (Hewitson, 1865)[
Graphium ucalegonides (Staudinger, 1884)

References

External links
External images

poggianus
Butterflies described in 1884
Butterflies of Africa